Chugoku Region Lullaby ( or chūgoku chihō no komoriuta) is a traditional folk song in Okayama Prefecture, Chugoku region, Japan, and is a well known Japanese cradle song.

General

The song is best known by the arrangement by Kosaku Yamada that was made in 1938. An instrumental version, played on a harp, historically marked the end of transmission at night on RCC, broadcasting to Hiroshima Prefecture. Up until 1987, a violin version was used on Sanyo Broadcasting, in Okayama and Kagawa, also signalling the end of daily programming. During the shutdown of analog television in Japan on 24 July 2011, RCC played the song for the final time on the station's analog signal shortly before the station switched off its analog transmitters.

Lyrics

Japanese
ねんねこ　しゃっしゃりませ
寝た子の　可愛さ
起きて　泣く子の
ねんころろ　つらにくさ
ねんころろん　ねんころろん

ねんねこ　しゃっしゃりませ
きょうは　二十五日さ
あすは　この子の
ねんころろ　宮詣り
ねんころろん　ねんころろん

宮へ　詣った時
なんと言うて　拝むさ
一生　この子の
ねんころろ　まめなように
ねんころろん　ねんころろん

Romanized Japanese
Nenneko shasshari mase,
Neta ko no kawaisa.
Okite naku ko no
Nenkororo, tsura nikusa.
Nenkororon, nenkororon.

Nenneko shasshari mase,
Kyō wa nijūgo-nichi sa.
Asu wa kono ko no,
Nenkororo, Miya-mairi.
Nenkororon, nenkororon.

Miya e maitta toki,
Nan to yūte ogamu sa.
Issho kono ko no, 
Nenkororo, mame na yō ni.
Nenkororon, nenkororon.

English translation
Hushabye, sleep!
How cute is the face of the baby fallen asleep,
The baby who is awake and cries,
Hushabye, how hateful his face looks!
Hushabye!

Hushabye, sleep!
Today is the 25th day of his birth.
Tomorrow we will go,
Hushabye, to the shrine,
Hushabye!

Arriving at the shrine,
what will you pray for?
Through his life, may he be,
Hushabye, healthy!
Hushabye!

See also

 Lullaby
 Folk song
 Other Japanese lullabies: Edo Lullaby, Itsuki Lullaby, Takeda Lullaby, etc.

References

External links
 Chugoku Region Lullaby (A men's chorus, YouTube)
 Region Lullaby (Played by the Japanese zither, YouTube)

Lullabies
Japanese folk songs
Japanese children's songs
Okayama Prefecture
Chūgoku region
Songwriter unknown
Year of song unknown